

Public General Acts

|-
| {{|Fuel and Electricity (Control) Act 1973|public|67|06-12-1973|maintained=y|An Act to make temporary provision for controlling the production, supply, acquisition and use of certain substances and of electricity; and for purposes connected with those matters.}}
|-
| {{|International Sugar Organisation Act 1973|public|68|19-12-1973|maintained=y|An Act to provide for the continued application to the International Sugar Organisation of section 1 of the International Organisations Act 1968.}}
|-
| {{|Northern Ireland Constitution (Amendment) Act 1973|public|69|19-12-1973|maintained=y|An Act to provide that the number of persons who may hold appointments under section 8 of the Northern Ireland Constitution Act 1973 shall be increased to fifteen of whom not more than eleven may be members of the Northern Ireland Executive appointed in accordance with this Act.}}
|-
| {{|Consolidated Fund Act 1974|public|1|22-01-1974|An Act to apply certain sums out of the Consolidated Fund to the service of the years ending on 31st March 1974 and 1975.}}
|-
| {{|Appropriation Act 1974|public|2|08-02-1974|An Act to appropriate the supplies granted in this Session of Parliament.}}
|-
| {{|Slaughterhouses Act 1974|public|3|08-02-1974|maintained=y|An Act to consolidate certain enactments relating to slaughterhouses and knackers' yards and the slaughter of animals.}}
|-
| {{|Legal Aid Act 1974|public|4|08-02-1974|An Act to consolidate certain enactments relating to legal aid and legal advice and assistance.}}
|-
| {{|Horticulture (Special Payments) Act 1974|public|5|08-02-1974|maintained=y|An Act to authorise payments out of moneys provided by Parliament to assist certain commercial growers of horticultural produce, the growing of which has become uneconomic as a result of the United Kingdom's membership of the European Economic Community.}}
|-
| {{|Biological Weapons Act 1974|public|6|08-02-1974|maintained=y|An Act to prohibit the development, production, acquisition and possession of certain biological agents and toxins and of biological weapons.}}
|-
| {{|Local Government Act 1974|public|7|08-02-1974|maintained=y|An Act to make further provision, in relation to England and Wales, with respect to the payment of grants to local authorities, rating and valuation, borrowing and lending by local authorities and the classification of highways; to extend the powers of the Countryside Commission to give financial assistance; to provide for the establishment of Commissions for the investigation of administrative action taken by or on behalf of local and other authorities; to restrict certain grants under the Transport Act 1968; to provide for the removal or relaxation of certain statutory controls affecting local government activities; to make provision in relation to the collection of sums by local authorities on behalf of water authorities; to amend section 259(3) of the Local Government Act 1972 and to make certain minor amendments of or consequential on that Act; and for connected purposes.}}
|-
| {{|Statutory Corporations (Financial Provisions) Act 1974|public|8|08-02-1974|maintained=y|An Act to make provision for compensating certain statutory corporations in respect of financial loss due to compliance with the national policy relating to limitation of prices, and for extending the borrowing powers of certain statutory corporations; and for purposes connected with those matters.}}
|-
| {{|Pensions (Increase) Act 1974|public|9|08-02-1974|maintained=y|An Act to provide for increases of certain official pensions and to amend the Pensions (Increase) Act 1971; and for purposes connected therewith.}}
|-
| {{|Representation of the People Act 1974|public|10|08-02-1974|An Act to increase the limits on candidates' election expenses at elections to the Parliament of the United Kingdom, and for connected purposes.}}
|-
| {{|Charlwood and Horley Act 1974|public|11|08-02-1974|maintained=y|An Act to transfer parts of the new parishes of Charlwood and Horley to the new county of Surrey, and for connected purposes.}}
}}

Local Acts

|-
| {{|Clyde Port Authority (Hunterston Ore Terminal) Order Confirmation Act 1973|local|35|19-12-1973|An Act to confirm a Provisional Order under the Private Legislation Procedure (Scotland) Act 1936, relating to Clyde Port Authority (Hunterston Ore Terminal).|po1=Clyde Port Authority (Hunterston Ore Terminal) Order 1973|Provisional Order to authorise the Clyde Port Authority to construct works and acquire land; and for other purposes.}}
|-
| {{|North Wales Hydro Electric Power Act 1973|local|36|19-12-1973|An Act to confer powers upon the Central Electricity Generating Board for the construction and erection of works and a generating station in the county of Caernarvon and for the acquisition of lands and easements for the purposes thereof or in connection therewith; and for other purposes.}}
|-
| {{|Harwich Harbour Act 1974|local|1|08-02-1974|An Act to consolidate with amendments statutory provisions relating to the Harwich Harbour Conservancy Board; to confer new powers on the Board; and for other purposes.}}
}}

References

Lists of Acts of the Parliament of the United Kingdom